Natriciteres is a genus of snakes in the subfamily Natricinae of the family Colubridae. The genus is endemic to Sub-Saharan Africa.

Species
The following six species are recognized as being valid.
Natriciteres bipostocularis  – southwestern forest marsh snake
Natriciteres fuliginoides  – collared marsh snake
Natriciteres olivacea  – olive marsh snake
Natriciteres pembana  – variable marsh snake
Natriciteres sylvatica  – forest marsh snake
Natriciteres variegata  – variable marsh snake

Nota bene: A binomial authority in parentheses indicates that the species was originally described in a genus other than Natriciteres.

References

Further reading
Loveridge A (1953). "Zoological Results of a Fifth Expedition to East Africa. III. Reptiles from Nyasaland and Tete". Bulletin of the Museum of Comparative Zoology at Harvard College, in Cambridge  110 (3): 141-322 + Plates 1–5. (Natriciteres, new genus, pp. 248–250).

Natriciteres
Snake genera
Taxa named by Arthur Loveridge